Hippolyte Rolin, (born Kortrijk 6 September 1804; died Ghent 8 March 1888) was a lawyer and Belgian Minister of Public Works 1848-1850.

Hippolyte Rolin was the father of Gustave Rolin-Jaequemyns and uncle by marriage of Joseph Hellebaut. Rolin studied at the University of Ghent where he finished his studies in 1827 with distinction. He then went to upgrade to Berlin where he attended seminars of Savigny and Hegel.

During his tenure as Minister of Public Works, Rolin was responsible for the creation of the first Belgian postage stamp, the so-called Epaulettes type, in 1849.

Writings
Of delictorum probatione, Ghent, 1826.
Of juridictione judicum nostrorum erga extraneos, 1827.

References

Belgian politicians
People from Kortrijk
1804 births
1888 deaths